The Canadian Association of General Surgeons is a professional association for general surgeons in Canada.  It was founded in 1977.

History 

The Canadian Association of General Surgeons held its inaugural meeting on 11 May 1977 at the Royal York Hotel in Toronto, Ontario, Canada, to which all general surgeons in Canada were invited.  Both the Royal College of Physicians and Surgeons of Canada and the Professional Corporation in Quebec appreciated the importance of continuing education and consultation with National Specialties Societies, and supported the establishment of the Canadian Association of General Surgeons in order to represent what were then 2000 general surgeons across the country.

Organization 

The Canadian Association of General Surgeons (CAGS) is the main national organization representing the interests of General Surgeons in Canada.  The mission for CAGS is "The Canadian Association of General Surgeons promotes the training, education, continuing professional development, thoughtful practice and research essential to the provision of the exemplary surgical care Canadians expect and deserve". The vision of CAGS is that "The Canadian Association of General Surgeons is the voice of the specialty of General Surgery in Canada". CAGS is sponsoring society of the Canadian Journal of Surgery.

CAGS offers its members a range of educational opportunities, supports surgical research, and provides a forum for Canadian General Surgeons to discuss the issues that challenge the specialty of General Surgery. CAGS sponsors a yearly meeting called the Canadian Surgery Forum. This meeting is held in a different major Canadian city each year. It also administers a yearly in-training examination administered for all residents enrolled in Canadian general surgery training programs free of charge. This examination is also offered at a fee for any CAGS member at the annual Canadian Surgery Forum. In support of research, CAGS operates a research fund called the Canadian Surgical Research Fund (CSRF). This fund was created in the 1980s to promote research by general surgeons and general surgery residents in clinical and basic science.  The CSRF currently funds two research projects per year and sponsors an annual research retreat for general surgery residents across Canada.

CAGS is composed of many committees including the examination committee, the resident committee, the international surgery committee, as well as various subspecialty committees (such as the oncology committee and the head and neck surgery committee).

Membership 

Membership in CAGS falls under one of eight different categories:

 Active Member: Must be certified to practice General Surgery in North America
 Associate Resident: Must be enrolled in a Canadian General Surgery Program
 Associate Fellow: Must be enrolled in a Fellowship Program in North America
 Affiliate Member: Allied health professional, technician, office manager, or other medical specialist (outside of General Surgery).
 International Member: Must be enrolled in surgical training outside of North America and must provide two letters of support from active CAGS Members.
 Medical Student: Must be enrolled in medical school
 Senior/Retired Member: Must be a retired medical practitioner who has held a valid certificate in general surgery in North America, and has been an Active Member for a minimum of five years
 Honorary Member: Must have been an active member and nominated by the CAGS Executive

Arms

References

External links
Canadian Association of General Surgeons

Medical associations based in Canada
Organizations based in Toronto